Josué Smith Solar (December 8, 1867 – 1938) was a Chilean architect.

Life and career 
Josué Smith Solar was born in San Nicolás, Chile, son of American engineer Silas Baldwin Smith and  Chilean citizen Leonor Solar Ojeda. Smith Solar studied in Chillán and at the Colegio de los Sagrados Corazones of Santiago. In 1885, he began to study architecture at the Polytechnic College of Pennsylvania, United States.

In 1889 he traveled to Europe and returned to the United States in 1891, where he opened an architectural firm in Wilmington, Delaware. In 1894 he moved with his wife Cecilia Celestine Miller to Chile to reside there for some years, and they finally established themselves in that country.

Architectural works 
Smith's main works were the following:

 Gran Hotel de Papudo, 1911, Papudo 
 Club Hípico de Santiago, 1921–1923, Santiago, Chile
 Universidad Técnica Federico Santa María, 1931, Valparaíso, Chile
 Hotel Carrera, Santiago de Chile
 Remodeling of the southern facade of the Palacio de La Moneda, Santiago de Chile
 Remodeling of the Museo Nacional de Historia Natural, Santiago de Chile.
 Ministerio de Hacienda Building, Santiago de Chile
 Santiago College, Sede Los Leones, 1929–1932, Chile
 Colegio Inglés para Señoritas (Currently Universidad Metropolitana de Ciencias para la Educación), 1925, Santiago de Chile.
 Portal Fernández Concha, 1927–1933, Santiago de Chile.
 Puente del Arzobispo, 1929, Santiago de Chile.
 Teatro Municipal de Chillán, Chillán

Gallery

References

Bibliography 

 
 

Chilean architects
1867 births
1938 deaths